Phoebe Ellen Ceresia (born April 1, 1967) (known professionally as Phoebe Augustine) is an American actress best known for playing Ronette Pulaski in Twin Peaks.

Career 
She portrayed Laura Palmer's friend Ronette Pulaski in several episodes of the original 1990 series Twin Peaks. The pilot episode featured a scene of her walking across train tracks. The image was used widely for promotional and marketing purposes, including on the VHS cover of the original Pilot, which was released as a movie in Europe, and became iconic in pop culture. She reprised her role in the 1992 prequel movie Twin Peaks: Fire Walk With Me.

Other roles include the movie Plain Clothes (1987) and two notable short-lived sitcoms from the early 90s: The Elvira Show and Frannie's Turn. Around the same time, she also appeared in the TV movie Black Widow Murders: The Blanche Taylor Moore Story. She was a musician/singer in the band "Cling".

After a break of many years, she returned to acting in 2017, working again with David Lynch on the Twin Peaks revival, Twin Peaks: The Return, playing "American Girl" in Part 3, a mysterious entity that may or may not be related to her previous role as Ronette.

Filmography

Film

Television

References

External links

 

Living people
American film actresses
American television actresses
1967 births
21st-century American women